Babydoll is a 1988 Hindi-language platinum-selling pop album by Indipop star Alisha Chinai. The success of the Babydoll album, and that of Suneeta Rao's album Senorita (1989), encouraged HMV to promote other early Indipop stars such as Ali Haider (1990). The album was reportedly India's "first fully computerised album". The sound engineer was Rajesh Johri, alias 'Wizkid', Alisha's husband.

Track listing
Babydoll / 	बेबी डॉल
Superman	
Kootchie Koo	
Jaane Jaana	
Shor Sharaaba	
Mashooka	
For Adults Only	
Pyaar
Babydoll (Reprise)

References

1988 albums
Hindi-language albums
Alisha Chinai albums